Abele  is a surname. It may refer to:
 Anton Abele (born 1992), Swedish politician
 Arnulf Abele (1914–2000), German military officer
 Arthur Abele (born 1986), German decathlete
 Chris Abele (born 1967), American businessman and philanthropist
 Christoph Ignaz Abele (1628–1685), Austrian jurist
 Doris Abele, German marine biologist
 Ekkehard Abele, German opera singer
 Johann Martin Abele (1753–1805), German publisher
 John Abele (born 1937), American businessman
 Julian Abele (1881–1950), American architect
 Lawrence G. Abele (born 1947), American academic
 Mannert L. Abele (1903–1942), American naval officer
 Matthias Abele (1618–1677), Austrian jurist
 Pete Abele (1916–2000), American politician

Middle name 
 Julian Abele Cook Jr. (1930–2017), United States District Court judge

References 

Germanic-language surnames
Surnames from given names